Rüdiger Kuhlbrodt is a German film and theatre actor and director.

Life
Rüdiger Kuhlbrodt was born in Hamburg, Germany, on 20 November 1942. After high school, he studied performing arts at the Hochschule für Musik und Theater Hamburg 
(University of Music and Theatre Hamburg). Kuhlbrodt joined the Stadttheater Pforzheim and the Mainfranken Theater Würzburg, later the Theater Lübeck and the Städtische Bühnen Münster, and in 1975, the Schauspielhaus Bochum. After a creative break that he spent in California, Kuhlbrodt with other artists established in 1980 an alternative theater project in the former Atlantic Movie Theatre in Düsseldorf. With various projects he toured throughout West German correction institutions and other theater-distant social facilities. In 1983, he was appointed a senior director at the Westfälisches Landestheater. In 1986, he was selected by Peter Zadek to the Deutsches Schauspielhaus in Hamburg.

After a stint at the Theater des Westens in 1992, Kuhlbrodt became a member of the Berliner Ensemble. After 1996, he made guest appearances at the Kammerspiele Berlin, the Deutsche Staatsoper Berlin, the Wiener Festwochen, the Schaubühne am Lehniner Platz, the Schlosspark-Theater Berlin, the Theater der Landeshauptstadt Magdeburg, the Hamburger Kammerspiele, the Ruhrtriennale, the Freilichtspiele Schwäbisch Hall, and the Salzburger Landestheater. In 2002, for political reasons, Kuhlbrodt established the independent group Global Heroes that appeared with the multimedia performance America at war: a mini-series.

Kuhlbrodt lives in Berlin and in Palm Beach, Florida.

Director
 1968: Max Frisch: The great anger of Philip Hotz
 1969: James Saunders: The Pedagogue
 1969: John Mortimer: The Mandatory Mandate
 1970: Christopher Fry: A Phoenix Too Frequent
 1971: René de Obaldia: Sea air
 1973: G.G. del Torre: Presumed Innocent
 1973: Louise Labé, Pierre de Ronsard: Love and Regret
 1980: Till Eulenspiegel
 1983: Janosch: I say you are a bear
 1984: The Glass Man
 1984: George Orwell: Nineteen Eighty-Four
 1985: Hans Fallada: Every Man Dies Alone
 1985: Germany a wonder fairy tale
 1987: Henry Miller: Sexus, Plexus and Nexus
 2007: Erich Kästner: The Blue Book. War diary and novel notes

Theater roles
 1975: Spring Awakening by Frank Wedekind, Role: Father Gabor, directed by Peter Zadek
 1976: The Sunshine Boys by Neil Simon, Role: Ben Clark, directed by Hans Lietzau
 1976: Menschen im Hotel (Grand Hotel) by Vicki Baum, Role: Baron von Geigern, directed by Rosa von Praunheim
 1977: Das Käthchen von Heilbronn by Heinrich von Kleist, Role: Georg von Waldstätten, directed by Werner Schroeter
 1978: Der Untertan by Heinrich Mann, Role: Major Fox, directed by Jürgen Flimm
 1979: Macskajáték (Catsplay) by István Örkény, directed by Jiří Menzel
 1986: Pravda by Howard Brenton, Role: Michael Quince, directed by Matthias Langhoff
 1987: Andy by Burkhard Driest, Role: Olaf Wolpe, directed by Peter Zadek
 1988: The "Lulu" plays Earth Spirit and Pandora's Box by Frank Wedekind, Role: Journalist Heilmann, directed by Peter Zadek
 1988: Punkt, Punkt, Komma, Strich by Wilfried Minks, Role: Ernst Jandl, directed by Wilfried Minks
 1989: Reineke Fuchs (Reynard the Fox) by Johann Wolfgang von Goethe, Role: Isegrimm the Wolf, directed by Michael Bogdanov
 1990: Amphitryon by Heinrich von Kleist, Role: Alcibiades, directed by Niels-Peter Rudolph
 1992: Der blaue Engel (The Blue Angle) by Heinrich Mann, Role: Konsul Wolters, directed by Peter Zadek
 1994: Antony and Cleopatra by William Shakespeare, Role: Thidias / Proculeius, directed by Peter Zadek
 1997: In der Sache J. Robert Oppenheimer (In the matter of J. Robert Oppenheimer) by Heinar Kipphardt, Role: Robert Oppenheimer, directed by Hermann Kleinselbeck
 1998: Doppelleben Deutsch (German double life) by Marc Pommerening, Role: Johannes R. Becher, directed by Hannes Hametner
 1998: Histoire de Pygmalion et Don Juan (Ballet), Role: Frederick the Great, directed by David Southerland
 2000: Hamlet by William Shakespeare, Role: Guildenstern, directed by Peter Zadek
 2001: Hitler's Doktor Faust by Rolf Hochhuth, Role: Nils Bohr, directed by Rolf Hochhuth
 2004: Wallenstein by Friedrich Schiller, Role: Wallenstein, directed by Axel Schneider
 2005: Don Carlos by Friedrich Schiller, Role: Philip II of Spain, directed by Manfred Weiss
 2008: Maestro by Christoph Klimke, Role: Maestro Karajan, directed by Johann Kresnik

Filmography

Cinema
 1980: Exit Sunset Boulevard, directed by Bastian Clevé
 1987: Der Einbruch (The Burglary), directed by Bettina Woernle
 1988: Blindman's Ball, directed by Dore O.
 1991: The Polar Bear King, directed by Ola Solum
 1994: Das Rätsel Knut Hamsun (The Riddle of Knut Hamsun), directed by Bentein Baarson
 1998: The Waiting Time, directed by Stuart Olme
 2006: The Somme – From Defeat to Victory
 2007: The Baader Meinhof Complex, directed by Uli Edel
 2009: Blissestraße, directed by Paul Donovan
 2010: Der ganz große Traum (The Ultimate Big Dream), directed by Sebastian Grobler
 2013: , directed by David Dietl

Television
 1983: Rote Erde (Red Earth), directed by Klaus Emmerich
 1993: Ispettore Sarti, directed by Giulio Questi
 1995: Die Angst hat eine kalte Hand (Fear has a cold hand), directed by Matti Geschonnek
 1999: Virtual Vampires, directed by Michael Busch
 1998: Die vier Gerechten (The Four Justices), directed by Wolfgang F. Henschel
 2000: The Tunnel, directed by Roland Suso Richter
 2004: Tsunami, directed by Winfried Oelsner
 2005: Die Bagdadbahn (The Baghdad Railway), directed by Roland May
 2005:  (Die Luftbrücke – Nur der Himmel war frei), directed by Dror Zahavi
 2006: Chubby Me, directed by Thomas Nennstiel
 2006: Polizeiruf 110, directed by Christine Hartmann
 2007: Tatort, directed by Angelina Maccarone
 2008: Puccini - die dunkle Seite des Mondes (Puccini - the dark side of the Moon), directed by Andreas Morell
 2009: Ein starkes Team, directed by Ulrich Zrenner
 2010: Schicksalsjahre (The Fateful Years), directed by Miguel Alexandre
 2011: Alarm für Cobra 11 – Die Autobahnpolizei, directed by Heinz Dietz
 2011: And all were silent, directed by Dror Zahavi
 2012: Heiter bis tödlich - Hubert und Staller, directed by Jan Markus Linhof
 2013: The Jerusalem Syndrome, directed by Dror Zahavi
 2014: , directed by Rainer Kaufmann

Notes

External links

 Acting agency 60plus
 Crew United
 

Living people
1942 births
Male actors from Hamburg
German theatre directors